Farewell Andromeda is the seventh studio album by American singer-songwriter John Denver, released in June 1973.  The LP made Billboard's Top 20, reaching No. 16, with three singles subsequently released:  "I'd Rather Be a Cowboy" [#62 POP, #25 AC], "Farewell Andromeda" [#89 POP, No. 20 AC] and "Please, Daddy" [#69 POP, No. 69 C&W].

Track listing

Personnel
John Denver – guitar, vocals
Eric Weissberg – banjo, steel guitar
Jan Camp Garrett – mandolin, vocals
Victor Garrett – bass, vocals
Lawrence Gottlieb – steel guitar, vocals
Lee Holdridge – string arrangements
Michael Holmes – piano
Dick Kniss – bass
Herbie Lovelle – drums
George Marge – woodwind
Frank Owens – piano
Paul Prestopino – guitar, autoharp
John Sommers – banjo, guitar, mandolin, vocals
Toots Thielemans – harmonica
Don Wardell – Executive Producer
Bryan Bowers – autoharp
Chip Taylor, Steve Chapin, Bill Danoff, Taffy Danoff, Steve Mandell, Martine Habib, Campden Street Choir – vocals
Technical
Kris O'Connor – assistant producer
Acy R. Lehman – art director
Mark English – cover art

References

John Denver albums
1973 albums
Albums arranged by Lee Holdridge
Albums produced by Milt Okun
RCA Records albums
Albums recorded at Morgan Sound Studios